is the first RPG Maker series title for Microsoft Windows. The tool is also the first version on computer systems in the series to receive an unauthorized English translation and release.

Etymology
It is named after Windows 95.

Features
RPG Maker 95 games run in 640×480 resolution and incorporates a 2D tile engine, that involve separate graphics files for characters, tile sets, backgrounds, and battle animations. The battle style of RPG Maker 95 is turn-based and in first-person perspective.  The music featured in RPG Maker consists of MIDI and wav files.

Create game specifications

Party specifications
Player's party can consists of up to 8 members, with maximum of first 4 members entering combat at a time.

RPG Maker 95 VALUE!

This version includes following changes:
Every time an event is created, the file name is no longer eve00000.Dat, but is decided by the map unit.
Windows XP support (requires 1.31.00 patch)

The first 2000 releases in Japan were accompanied with a soundtrack CD album "ZONDERLAND" of RPG themed music based on RPG Maker. Music was composed by the U.K. band INTELLIGENTSIA, who also created the RPG MAKER in game FX.

References

External links
Enterbrain page: 95 VALUE!
Enterbrain support page: 95, 95 VALUE! 

Video game IDE
95